Styopantsevo is a rural locality (a settlement) and the administrative center of Styopantsevskoye Rural Settlement, Vyaznikovsky District, Vladimir Oblast, Russia. The population was 2,221 as of 2010. There are 33 streets.

Geography 
Styopantsevo is located 36 km southwest of Vyazniki (the district's administrative centre) by road. Korovintsevo is the nearest rural locality.

References 

Rural localities in Vyaznikovsky District